This is a list of Georgia Bulldogs football players selected in the NFL Draft.

Key

Selections

Notes
Freddie Gilbert was drafted in the 1984 NFL Supplemental Draft.

Notable undrafted players
Note: No drafts held before 1920

References

Georgia

Georgia Bulldogs NFL Draft